Craugastor rupinius is a species of frogs in the family Craugastoridae. It is found in the southeastern Mexico (Chiapas), southern Guatemala, El Salvador, and western Honduras. Common name cliffy stream frog has been coined for it.

Etymology
The specific name rupinius is from Latin rupina, meaning "rocky chasm", in reference to the rocky stream environments this species inhabits.

Description
The upper eyelids have a few scattered, large tubercles. The canthus rostralis is moderately sharp and tympanum is distinct; supratympanic fold is moderately developed. Dorsal skin is rugose with scattered large tubercles. The coloration of the dorsum varies: various shades of brown, yellow-brown, reddish brown, or live-brown are all recorded. Some females show a whitish or pale yellow vertebral line or stripe. Most individuals have a black interorbital line. Some individuals have dark limb bars. The iris is gold or copper-colored.

Habitat and conservation
It also occurs secondary forests and shade coffee plantations. While a common species, it is threatened by habitat loss, and potentially, chytridiomycosis.

References

rupinius
Amphibians of El Salvador
Amphibians of Guatemala
Amphibians of Honduras
Amphibians of Mexico
Amphibians described in 2000
Taxa named by Jonathan A. Campbell
Taxa named by Jay M. Savage
Taxonomy articles created by Polbot